Identity is the second studio album by American R&B group 3T. The album was first released independently and was then released through Warner Music. The album spawned two singles including "Stuck On You" and "Sex Appeal" and the Tredox remix for "Sex Appeal" features their cousin DEALZ. In Germany, the album was re-titled Sex Appeal.

Release history
 On December 29, 2004 the album was released in France by TF1 Musique. This version contained #13 as a bonus track.
 On January 18, 2005 the album was released in the USA by Fonky Records.
 On December 21, 2007 the album was released by WEA International. This version contained the two bonus tracks.
 In 2008 the album was available as a digital download on iTunes and Amazon MP3.

Track listing
All tracks written by Taj Jackson, Taryll Jackson, and TJ Jackson, except where noted.

Charts

References

3T albums
2004 albums